Soviet people, or citizens of the USSR, was an umbrella demonym for the population of the Soviet Union (1922–1991).

Nationality policy in the former Soviet Union
During the history of the Soviet Union, different doctrines and practices on ethnic distinctions within the Soviet population were applied at different times. Minority national cultures were never completely abolished. Instead the Soviet definition of national cultures required them to be "socialist by content and national by form", an approach that was used to promote the official aims and values of the state. The goal was always to cement the nationalities together in a common state structure. In the 1920s and the early 1930s, the policy of national delimitation was used to demarcate separate areas of national culture and the policy of korenizatsiya (indigenisation) was used to promote federalism and strengthen non-Russian languages and cultures. By the late 1930s, however, the policy was changed to a more active promotion of the Russian language and later to more overt Russification, which accelerated in the 1950s, especially in Soviet education. Although some assimilation did occur, it did not on the whole succeed. The continued development of the many national cultures in the Soviet Union led to the drafting of the New Union Treaty in 1991 and the subsequent dissolution of the Soviet Union.

Researchers' assessments 
Assessments of the success of the creation of the new community are divergent. On the one hand, the ethnologist V. A. Tishkov and other historians believe that "for all the socio-political deformities, the Soviet people represented a civil nation." The philosopher and sociologist B. A. Grushin noted that sociology in the USSR "recorded a unique historical type of society that had already gone into oblivion". At the same time, according to the sociologist T.N. Zaslavskaya, it "did not solve the main task associated with the typological identification of Soviet society".

In an interview with Euronews in 2011, Russian President Dmitry Medvedev recalled the use of the term "Soviet people" as a "single community" in the Soviet Union but added that "these constructions were largely theoretical".

Russian researchers have also paid attention to the topic of the formation and functioning of the consciousness of the Soviet people.

Post-Soviet Russia 
In contrast to Soviet national identity politics, which declared the Soviet people as an international and supranational community, the post-Soviet Russian Constitution speaks of a "multinational people of the Russian Federation". From the outset, the idea of the Russian nation as a community of all Russian citizens has met with opposition.

In 2010, the then President of Russia Dmitry Medvedev pointed out the lack of an all-Russian unifying idea as a problem during a discussion in the State Council and proposed "all-Russian patriotism" as a replacement for the idea of "the Soviet people".

See also
 Demographics of the Soviet Union
 Homo Sovieticus
 Melting pot
 New Soviet man
 Orthodoxy, Autocracy, and Nationality – the ideological doctrine of Russian emperor Nicholas I
 Rootless cosmopolitan
 Russification
 Zhonghua minzu – the equivalent notion in the People's Republic of China
 Yugoslavs

References

External links
 The Soviet People—A New Historical Community, a Soviet work from 1974 expounding on the concept
 Present-Day Ethnic Processes in the USSR, a Soviet work from 1982

Soviet people
Demographics of the Soviet Union
Propaganda in the Soviet Union
Soviet ethnic policy